Oakleigh Park is a loosely defined district in the north of the London Borough of Barnet. It adjoins Whetstone, and is often regarded either as part of that or of East Barnet, although the East Coast Main Line forms a border with the latter. The name is a relatively modern invention, after the eponymous station which opened in 1873. Since 2002 'Oakleigh' has also been the name of the electoral ward for the area, formed from parts of the abolished Hadley and Friern Barnet wards.

The principal road is Oakleigh Road North. Turnings off this road include Oakleigh Park North, Oakleigh Avenue and Oakleigh Park South. There is a small shopping parade on Netherlands Road just to the north of the railway station.

Education 
Primary schools in Oakleigh Park include:

 All Saints
 Sacred Heart

Transport

Bus
Transport for London bus route 383 stops directly outside Oakleigh Park railway station, as well as operating a Hail and Ride service along Netherlands Road and Oakleigh Park North/Athenaeum Road. Buses run towards Barnet (the Spires) or towards Woodside Park tube station, every 30 minutes Mondays to Saturdays except late evenings. There is currently no service on this route on Sundays or public holidays.

Railway station

Oakleigh Park railway station - Great Northern

Tube station
Nearby:

Totteridge and Whetstone tube station - Northern line

Notable people

British Army chaplain Noel Mellish, recipient of the Victoria Cross for his actions in rescuing wounded men during the First World War, was born at Trenabie House, in Oakleigh Park North, in 1880. The house no longer exists but in March 2016 a plaque was installed nearby in a ceremony attended by Mellish's daughter Claire.

John Betjeman visited the area while working at nearby Heddon Court and references "Oakley" Park and Rosslyn Avenue in the poem "The Outer Suburbs".

References

External links

 
Areas of London
Districts of the London Borough of Barnet